The Isle of Lost Ships is a 1929 talking film released in an alternative silent version with a Vitaphone track of effects and music. The picture was produced by Richard A. Rowland and distributed by Warner Bros. Irvin Willat was the director with Jason Robards Sr., Virginia Valli and Noah Beery Sr. in the leads. It is based on the 1909 novel The Isle of Dead Ships by Crittenden Marriott, and is also a remake of Maurice Tourneur's now lost 1923 classic of the same name. This film is preserved at the Library of Congress.

Cast
Jason Robards Sr. as Frank Howard
Virginia Valli as Dorothy Whitlock/Renwick
Noah Beery Sr. as Captain Peter Forbes
Clarissa Selwynne as Aunt Emma/Mrs. Renwick
Robert Emmett O'Connor as Jackson
Harry Cording as Gallagher
Margaret Fielding as Mrs. Gallagher
Kathrin Clare Ward as Mother Joyce/Burke
Robert Homans as Mr. Burke
Jack Ackroyd as Harry
Sam Baker as himself

Critical reception
A contemporary review in Variety reported that "the originality of the story [...] shares honors with the weird effect established by sets and the camera angles at which they are focused," that "the sets and atmosphere [...] keep an audience ever interested and tense," and described the scene in which the character Howard is "shot through a torpedo tube" as sufficiently quick and active that it "helps lessen the impossible." A contemporary review of the film in The New York Times reported that "the weird story is the strongest point and the acting negligible," that "[t]his queer tale, while not particularly helped by the addition of sound, appears as a relief from the musical films and those audible photoplays in which dialogue holds the centre of the screen," that the character Howard "not only knows all about ships, radios and women, but who also can man a submarine and teach a crew its operation in three minutes," and that "Virginia Valli does not do much more than scream a little now and then."

See also
 List of early Warner Bros. sound and talking features
 The Lost Continent (1968). Also set in the Sargasso Sea.

References

External links

 
German language release poster

1929 films
American silent feature films
Films directed by Irvin Willat
Films based on American novels
Remakes of American films
1929 drama films
American black-and-white films
Transitional sound films
Films about survivors of seafaring accidents or incidents
American drama films
1920s American films
Silent American drama films
Silent adventure films
1920s English-language films